Lauritz Wigand-Larsen (24 August 1895 – 4 June 1951) was a Norwegian gymnast who competed in the 1920 Summer Olympics. He was part of the Norwegian team, which won the gold medal in the gymnastics men's team, free system event. He was born and died in Bergen, and represented Bergens TF.

References

1895 births
1951 deaths
Norwegian male artistic gymnasts
Gymnasts at the 1920 Summer Olympics
Olympic gymnasts of Norway
Olympic silver medalists for Norway
Sportspeople from Bergen
Olympic medalists in gymnastics
Medalists at the 1920 Summer Olympics
20th-century Norwegian people